The 1937 Mercer Bears football team was an American football team that represented Mercer University as a member of the Dixie Conference during the 1937 college football season. In their ninth year under head coach Lake Russell, the team compiled a 4–5 record.

Schedule

References

Mercer
Mercer Bears football seasons
Mercer Bears football